Carlos Johnson may refer to:

 Carlos Johnson (musician), alto saxophonist and singer
 Carlos Johnson (blues musician) (born 1953), blues guitarist and singer based in Chicago
 Carlos Johnson (footballer) (born 1984), Costa Rican soccer player